Agios Georgios is a village of the Deskati municipality. The 2011 census found no inhabitants in the village. The previous census of 2001 had recorded 10 inhabitants in the village. Agios Georgios is a part of the community of Deskati.

See also
 List of settlements in the Grevena regional unit

References

Populated places in Grevena (regional unit)